Loretta Devine (born August 21, 1949) is an American actress, singer and voice actor. She is known for numerous roles across stage and screen. Her most high profile roles include Lorrell Robinson in the original Broadway production of Dreamgirls, the long-suffering Gloria Matthews in the film Waiting to Exhale, and her recurring role as Adele Webber on the medical drama Grey's Anatomy, for which she won a Primetime Emmy Award for Outstanding Guest Actress in a Drama Series in 2011.

Early life 
Loretta Devine was born in Houston, Texas, on August 21, 1949. She grew up in the Acres Homes area of Houston, where her mother was a single mother to six children. She was very active on the pep squad, and performed in talent shows at George Washington Carver High School.

In 1971, Devine graduated from the University of Houston with a Bachelor of Arts in Speech and Drama. In 1976, she received a Master of Fine Arts in Theater from Brandeis University.

She was initiated into the Epsilon Lambda chapter of Alpha Kappa Alpha.

Career

Stage work 
Devine has worked extensively on Broadway. Her Broadway debut was in 1978 in a musical called A Broadway Musical, which closed after 14 previews and only one performance on December 21, 1978. She captured attention in her second Broadway show, called Comin' Uptown, which featured Gregory Hines.

She rose to stardom in Dreamgirls, a smash 1981 Broadway musical loosely based on the history of The Supremes, in which she originated the role of Lorrell Robinson (a fictional character based on Mary Wilson). The story of Dreamgirls was created during workshops that were carried out in six-week workshops over the period of three years, which Devine, Sheryl Lee Ralph, and Jennifer Holliday developed via improv. She also received raves in the 1995 Apollo revival of The Wiz as Glinda the Good Witch of the South.

Film 
While rehearsing for Dreamgirls  with a little girl in 1981, Devine was cast in Jessie Maple's Will, the first independent feature-length film directed by an African-American woman. For her featured role in the low-budget film, Devine earned $500.

Minor roles for Devine followed in films such as Little Nikita and Stanley & Iris. She has a cameo performance in the film version of Dreamgirls.

In 1995, she landed a major role as Gloria Matthews in Waiting to Exhale, opposite Whitney Houston, Gregory Hines, and Angela Bassett. The role earned her an NAACP Image Award for Outstanding Supporting Actress in a Motion Picture, as did her next movie, The Preacher's Wife, her second movie with Houston and Hines. She later co-starred opposite Alfre Woodard in Down in the Delta (1998) and Funny Valentines (1999).

Television and continued film successes 
Devine played roles as a repertory character in the play The Colored Museum with Vickilyn Reynolds. Devine and Reynolds both went on to play sisters in the short-lived TV series Sugar and Spice. During the period between the play and the series, Devine appeared in the first season of the TV series A Different World as Stevie Rallen, a dormitory director at the fictional Hillman College.

From 2000 to 2004, Devine starred as high school teacher Marla Hendricks on the Fox drama series Boston Public. Devine won three more Image Awards for her work in the series. She also continued to work in film, playing prominent roles in Urban Legend, Urban Legends: Final Cut, and I Am Sam. Devine earned yet another Image Award nomination and an Independent Spirit Award nomination for her work in the 2004 film Woman Thou Art Loosed. She also appeared in the 2005 film Crash. In 2007, she appeared in This Christmas, and in the next year had a series regular role on the ABC comedy-drama Eli Stone. Devine also was part of the ensemble casts of two Tyler Perry-directed films For Colored Girls and Madea's Big Happy Family. In 2008, she was featured prominently on George Michael's remake of "Feeling Good." She also appeared in First Sunday, Beverly Hills Chihuahua and Jumping the Broom.

Devine had a recurring role in the Shonda Rhimes drama series Grey's Anatomy as Dr. Richard Webber's first wife, Adele. In 2011 she won a Primetime Emmy Award for Outstanding Guest Actress in a Drama Series for her performance. She was nominated for a second time for her performance in 2012. Devine also won Gracie Allen Award for Outstanding Female Actor in a Feature Role for Grey's Anatomy in 2012.

In 2011, she also starred on the short-lived ABC Family comedy State of Georgia. In 2012, she was part of Being Mary Jane cast. She also voiced the character Hallie, on the Disney Junior series Doc McStuffins. Later that year she began starring in the Lifetime series The Client List, playing the role of Georgia Cummings, the owner of the massage parlor where the lead character Riley Parks works. The series was canceled after two seasons. Devine also played Cynthia Carmichael on the NBC sitcom The Carmichael Show. Devine currently stars on the Netflix series, Family Reunion, with Richard Roundtree and Tia Mowry-Hardrict.

Filmography

Films

Television

Video games

Stage appearances 
Minister, Godsong, La MaMa E.T.C., New York City, 1978
(Broadway debut) Dionne, Hair (revival), Biltmore Theatre, 1977
Soloist, Langston Hughes, AMAS Repertory Theatre, 1977
Title role, Karma, Richard Allen Center, New York City, 1977
Gloria, Verandah, New Dramatists, 1977
Soloists, Seasons Reasons, Henry Street Settlement Playhouse, New York City, 1977
Yenta lady, A Broadway Musical, Lunt-Fontanne Theatre, New York City, 1978
Loretta, Miss Truth, Apollo Theatre, New York City, 1978
Bones, Circle in the Square Theatre, New York City, 1978
Glinda the Good Witch of the South, The Wiz, Henry Street Settlement Playhouse, 1978
Virtue, The Blacks, Richard Allen Center, New York City, 1978
Young Mary, Comin' Uptown, Winter Garden Theatre, New York City, 1979
Jewel, Lion and the Jewel, Lincoln Center, New York City, 1980
Precious, Dementos, City Center, New York City, 1980
Lorell Robinson, Dreamgirls, Imperial Theatre, New York City, 1981
The Casting of Kevin Christian, Shepherd Street Art Gallery, 1983
Mermaid, Gotta Getaway!, Radio City Music Hall, New York City, 1984
Janeen Earl-Taylor, Long Time Since Yesterday, Henry Street Settlement Playhouse, New York City, 1985
Lilly, Big Deal, Broadway Theater, New York City, 1986
Lala, Wigs, and model, The Colored Museum, Public Theaters/Susan Stein Shiva Theater, New York City, 1986
Delia, Spunk, Mark Taper Forum, Los Angeles, 1990
Billie Holiday, Lady Day at Emerson's Bar and Grill, Old Globe Theatre, San Diego, CA, then Little Theatre, Phoenix, AZ, 1991
Holly Day, Rabbit Foot, Los Angeles Theatre Center, Los Angeles, 1991
Charlesetta, East Texas Hot Links, The Met, Los Angeles, 1991
Soloist, Rodgers, Hart, Hammerstein Tribute, Embassy Theatre, 1991
Soloist, Big Moments on Broadway, Kennedy Center Opera House, Washington, DC, 1991
Glinda The Good Witch of The South, The Wiz, Apollo Revival, 1995
Also appeared as Cissy, Woman from the Town and in A Midsummer Night's Dream and The Hot Mikado in 1990.

Awards and nominations

See also 
 History of the African-Americans in Houston

References

External links 

1949 births
Living people
Brandeis University alumni
Actresses from Houston
University of Houston alumni
20th-century American actresses
21st-century American actresses
Primetime Emmy Award winners
African-American actresses
American television actresses
American film actresses
American voice actresses
American musical theatre actresses
African-American women singers
American stage actresses
People from View Park–Windsor Hills, California